Here is a list of places, divided by ceremonial counties of England.

See also
Toponymy of England
Toponymical list of counties of the United Kingdom
List of generic forms in British place names
List of places in the United Kingdom
Subdivisions of the United Kingdom
List of places in Northern Ireland
List of places in Scotland
List of places in Wales
List of cities in the United Kingdom
List of towns in England

 B
 
Places